Juan Carlos Covarrubias Muñoz (born 1961), commonly known as Juan Covarrubias, is a Chilean footballer who played as a left midfielder in the Chilean Primera División.

Career
He made his debut in 1976 in Talca Rangers, later defended the colors of his hometown of Green Cross Temuco in 1980. Then in 1983 he was part of the cast of Cobreloa and vie for the Copa Libertadores.

In 1995, he arrived at Everton and while his contract was for two years chose to leave because of problems in the team. Before ending his career, he joined the staff of Ñublense. After finishing his career as a footballer, he devoted himself entirely to his business of moving personnel and cargo transport. He currently serves as the technical manager of football young Ñublense.

Striker Marcelo Salas, also born in Temuco, has mentioned Juan Covarrubias as a childhood idol.

References

1961 births
Living people
Chilean footballers
Chile international footballers
Rangers de Talca footballers
Cobreloa footballers
Everton de Viña del Mar footballers
Ñublense footballers
Deportes Temuco footballers
1989 Copa América players
Association football midfielders
People from Temuco